Anasuya Bharadwaj (born 15 May 1985) is an Indian television presenter and actress who works in Telugu films and television. She has received two South Indian International Movie Awards, an IIFA Utsavam Award and South filmfare Awards for her performances in the films Kshanam (2016) and Rangasthalam (2018).

Early life

Bharadwaj received her MBA from Badruka College in 2008, after which she worked as an HR executive. Refusing a lot of early movie offers, she worked as a TV anchor for Sakshi TV.

Career
After working as a news presenter for Sakshi TV, Bharadwaj worked as an anchor on Maa music. She worked as a dubbing artist for the films Vedam and Paisa.  She, later on, appeared as a TV anchor on Jabardasth, a comedy show. The show elevated her career. In 2016, She acted in film Soggade Chinni Nayana opposite to Nagarjuna. Later, in the same year, she made her debut with Kshanam in which she portrayed a negative lead role. As a known anchor, Bharadwaj has hosted many awards shows, like Zee Kutumbam Awards and Star Parivaar Awards, and she has hosted Okarikokaru Awards on Zee Telugu three times. She has performed at the Apsara awards function and GAMA Awards Dubai. She hosted Devi Sri Prasad's US concert. She acted as Rangamatta in Rangasthalam that was well acclaimed. In Pushpa: The Rise, she acted as Dakshayini that pushed her career further up.

In 2021, she contested in the elections to Movie Artists Association (MAA).

Personal life 
Anasuya Bharadwaj has been married to Susank Bharadwaj since 2010 and has two children with him.

Filmography

Film

Television

Awards and nominations

References

External links

 

Indian women television presenters
Indian television presenters
Living people
Filmfare Awards South winners
Telugu television anchors
Actresses in Telugu television
Actresses in Telugu cinema
Actresses in Malayalam cinema
21st-century Indian actresses
1985 births
South Indian International Movie Awards winners
Zee Cine Awards Telugu winners
Actresses from Visakhapatnam
Indian film actresses
Telugu actresses
Indian television actresses
 Television personalities from Andhra Pradesh